Autumn Mills (born July 24, 1988) is a former competitor with the York Lions women's ice hockey program. She is a member of the Canada women's national baseball team which won a silver medal at the 2015 Pan American Games.

Playing career

Hockey
In 2009, she was recognized by Ontario University Athletics as one of the top female scholar-athletes. She was recognized at the sixth annual Women of Influence Luncheon on February 10, 2009.

On January 29, 2011, she registered five points in a 6–4 victory over the Western Mustangs women's ice hockey team. The game took place in her hometown of London, Ontario. After the 2010–11 season, Mills was the Ontario University Athletics (OUA) nominee for the 2011 Canadian Interuniversity Sport (CIS) Marion Hillard Award.

Baseball
Mills joined the Canadian national women's baseball team at the age of 16 years. She has been a pitcher with the squad since 2005 and won a national championship with Team Ontario.
She has competed in five IBAF World Cup competitions, capturing three medals (two bronze and one silver). At the 2012 Women's Baseball World Cup, Mills got the save in the bronze medal game victory over Australia in Edmonton, Alberta.
During 2015, she was one of three women (including teammate Ashley Stephenson that served as instructors at the Toronto Blue Jays Baseball Academy.

Awards and honours
 2007-08 Canadian Interuniversity Sport Academic All-Canadian honour roll
 2009 OUA top female scholar-athletes
 York University's selection for OUA Woman of Influence (2009)
 York University female athlete of the week for the period ending Jan. 30, 2011.
 York University's Bryce M. Taylor Award (2011)
 Pioneer Petroleums Ontario University Athletics (OUA) female athlete of the week for the period ending Jan. 30, 2011.
 Runner-up, 2011 Marion Hillard Award.

Personal
Earned a Bachelor of Arts Degree in kinesiology from York University. Currently, she is employed as a police officer

References

1988 births
Baseball people from Ontario
Baseball players at the 2015 Pan American Games
Canadian female baseball players
Canadian women's ice hockey players
Ice hockey people from Ontario
Living people
Sportspeople from London, Ontario
Pan American Games silver medalists for Canada
Pan American Games medalists in baseball
Medalists at the 2015 Pan American Games
York Lions women's ice hockey players